The Catholic Christian Church is a Catholic Christian religious denomination founded in 1977 by W. D. de Ortega Maxey.

Maxey, who had earlier served in a variety of capacities with the  Old Catholic Church in America, the Temple of the People (a theosophical group), the Apostolic Episcopal Church, and then resigned his episcopal positions and joined the Universalist Church, founded the church after 25 years with the Universalist Church. With the help of Archbishop Joachim of the Western Orthodox Church in America, he ordained Alan S. Stanford as his coadjutor bishop. In that capacity, Stanford is in charge of the church's ministry in the San Francisco area, which include the church's chapel, the Holy Order of the Society of St. Jude Thaddeus, and the National Catholic Street Ministry Project.

The church has two bishops and three priests, working in the San Francisco area and three mission stations.

See also
Christian denomination
Independent Catholic churches

References

Christian organizations established in 1977
Nontrinitarian denominations
Christian denominations established in the 20th century
Street ministry
1977 establishments in the United States
Independent Catholic denominations